Madagascar competed at the 2016 Summer Olympics in Rio de Janeiro, Brazil, from 5 to 21 August 2016. This was the nation's twelfth appearance at the Summer Olympics, with the exception of the 1976 Summer Olympics in Montreal and the 1988 Summer Olympics in Seoul, because of the African and North Korean boycott, respectively.

Malagasy Olympic Committee sent a total of six athletes, two men and four women, to compete in four sports at the Games. The nation's roster was relatively smaller than those sent to London 2012 by a single athlete, with the women outnumbering the men for the third consecutive time.

The Malagasy team featured three returning Olympians from the previous Games: freestyle swimmer Estellah Fils Rabetsara, hurdler Ali Kame, and steeplechase runner Eliane Saholinirina. Judoka Asaramanitra Ratiarison was originally selected to carry the Madagascar flag, but declined to do so due to her competition schedule on the first day of the Games. Instead, Saholinirina took the vacant spot previously held by Ratiarison to lead her team in the opening ceremony. Madagascar, however, has yet to win its first ever Olympic medal.

Athletics
 
Malagasy athletes have so far achieved qualifying standards in the following athletics events (up to a maximum of 3 athletes in each event):

Track & road events

Judo

Madagascar has qualified one judoka for the women's extra-lightweight category (48 kg) at the Games. Asaramanitra Ratiarison earned a continental quota spot from the Africa region as Madagascar's top-ranked judoka outside of direct qualifying position in the IJF World Ranking List of May 30, 2016.

Swimming

Madagascar has received a Universality invitation from FINA to send two swimmers (one male and one female) to the Olympics.

Weightlifting

Madagascar has received an invitation from the Tripartite Commission to send Elisa Ravololoniaina in the women's middleweight category (63 kg) to the Olympics.

References

External links
 
 

Nations at the 2016 Summer Olympics
2016
Olympics